Panthera spelaea, also known as the Eurasian cave lion, European cave lion or steppe lion, is an extinct Panthera species that most likely evolved in Europe after the third Cromerian interglacial stage, less than 600,000 years ago. Phylogenetic analysis of fossil bone samples revealed that it was highly distinct and genetically isolated from the modern lion (Panthera leo) occurring in Africa and Asia. 

Nuclear genomic evidence shows a more recent split approximately 500,000 years ago, with no subsequent interbreeding with the ancestors of the modern lion. The oldest known bone fragments were excavated in Yakutia and radiocarbon dated at least 62,400 years old. It became extinct about 13,000 years ago.

Taxonomy

Felis spelaea was the scientific name used by Georg August Goldfuss in 1810 for a fossil lion skull that was excavated in a cave in southern Germany. It possibly dates to the Würm glaciation.

Several authors regarded Panthera spelaea as a subspecies of the modern lion, and therefore as Panthera leo spelaea.
One author considered the cave lion to be more closely related to the tiger based on a comparison of skull shapes, and proposed the scientific name Panthera tigris spelaea.

Results from morphological studies showed that it is distinct in cranial and dental anatomy to justify the specific status of Panthera spelaea. Results of phylogenetic studies also support this assessment.

In 2001, the subspecies P. spelaea vereshchagini was proposed for seven specimens found in Siberia and Yukon, which have smaller skulls and teeth than the average P. spelaea. Before 2020, genetic analysis using ancient DNA provided no evidence for their distinct subspecific status; DNA signatures from P. spelaea from Europe and Alaska were indistinguishable, suggesting one large panmictic population. However, analysis of mitochondrial genome sequences from 31 cave lions showed that they fall into two monophyletic clades. One lived across western Europe and the other was restricted to Beringia during the Pleistocene. For this reason, the Beringian population is considered a distinct subspecies, P. s. vereshchagini.

Evolution
 
These cats dispersed to Europe from East Africa in the first half of the  Middle  Pleistocene, giving rise to P. fossilis in Central Europe by 610,000 years ago. Panthera spelaea evolved from P. fossilis about 460,000 years ago in central Europe during the late Saalian glaciation or early Eemian and would have been common throughout Eurasia from 450,000 to 14,000 years ago. Recent nuclear genomic evidence suggest that interbreeding between modern lions and all Eurasian fossil lions took place up until 500,000 years ago, but by 470,000 years ago, no subsequent interbreeding between the two lineages occurred.

P. spelaea bone fragments excavated in Poland were radiocarbon dated to between the early and late Weichselian glaciation, and are between 109,000 and 57,000 years old. In Eurasia, it became extinct between 14,900 and 14,100 years ago, and survived in Beringia until 13,800 to 13,300 years ago as the Weichselian glaciation receded. Mitochondrial DNA sequence data from fossil lion remains show that the American lion represents a sister group of P. spelaea, and likely arose when an early P. spelaea population became isolated south of the Cordilleran Ice Sheet about 340,000 years ago.
The following cladogram shows the genetic relationship between P. spelaea and other pantherine cats.

Characteristics

Carvings and cave paintings of cave lions, which were discovered in the Lascaux and Chauvet Caves in France, were dated to 15,000 to 17,000 years old. A drawing in the Chauvet cave depicts two cave lions walking together. The one in the foreground is slightly smaller than the one in the background, which has been drawn with a scrotum and without a mane. Such cave paintings suggest that male cave lions completely lacked manes, or at most had very small manes.

P. spelaea is also known from the Löwenmensch figurine found in Vogelherd cave in the Swabian Alb, southwest Germany, which dates to the Aurignacian culture. These archaeological artifacts indicate that it may have been featured in Paleolithic religious rituals.

P. spelaea was thought to have been one of the largest lion species. The heaviest  Panthera spelaea was estimated to weigh . 

This shows that P. spelaea  would have been up to or over 12% larger than modern lions, but still smaller than the earlier Panthera fossilis or the American lion (P. atrox). Cave paintings almost exclusively show hunting animals without a mane, suggesting that males were indeed maneless. P. spelaea had a relatively longer and narrower muzzle compared to that of the extant lion. Despite this, the two species do not exhibit major differences in morphology. Like modern lions, females were smaller than males.

In 2016, hair found near the Maly Anyuy River was identified as cave lion hair through DNA analysis. Comparison with hair of a modern lion revealed that cave lion hair was probably similar in colour as that of the modern lion, though slightly lighter. In addition, the cave lion is thought to have had a very thick and dense undercoat comprising closed and compressed yellowish-to-white wavy downy hair with a smaller mass of darker-coloured guard hairs, possibly an adaptation to the Ice Age climate.

Distribution and habitat

P. spelaea formed a contiguous population from Europe to Alaska over the Bering land bridge, across the range of the mammoth steppe. It was widely distributed from the Iberian Peninsula, Southeast Europe, Great Britain, Central Europe, the East European Plain, and across most of northern Eurasia into Canada and Alaska. The oldest known fossils were excavated in northeastern Yakutia and were radiocarbon dated at 62,400 years old. The youngest known fossils are dated 11,925 years old and originated near Fairbanks, Alaska.

Phalanx bones excavated in Spain's La Garma cave complex were radiocarbon dated to 14,300–14,000 years old.

In Yakutia's Khayrgas Cave, bones of P. spelaea were found together with remains of humans, wolf, reindeer, Pleistocene horse and fish in a layer dated 13,200–21,500 years old.

In 2008, a well-preserved mature cave lion specimen was unearthed near the Maly Anyuy River in Chukotka Autonomous Okrug in Russia, which still retained some clumps of hair.
The cave lion was probably predominantly found in open habitats such as steppe and grasslands although it would have also have occurred in open woodlands as well.

Discoveries

In 2015, two frozen cave lion cubs, estimated to be between 25,000 and 55,000 years old, were discovered close to the Uyandina River in Yakutia, Siberia in permafrost.
Research results indicate that the cubs were likely barely a week old at the time of their deaths, as their milk teeth had not fully erupted. Further evidence suggests the cubs were hidden at a den site until they were strong enough to follow their mother back to the pride, as with modern lions. Researchers believe that the cubs were trapped and killed by a landslide, and that the absence of oxygen underground hindered their decomposition and allowed the cubs to be preserved in such good condition. A second expedition to the site where the cubs were found was planned for 2016, in hopes of finding either the remains of a third cub or possibly the cubs' mother.

In 2017, another frozen specimen, thought to be a lion cub, was found in Yakutia on the banks of the Tirekhtyakh River, a tributary of the Indigirka River. This male cub was thought to be slightly older than the 2015 cubs at the time of its death; it is estimated to have been around one and a half to two months. It was considered to be around a month old when it died approximately 50,000 years ago, and presumed to be a sibling of the male cub. However, carbon dating showed them to have lived about 15,000 years apart, with the female estimated to have lived 28,000 years ago, and the male 43,448 years ago. Both cubs were well preserved, albeit with a few damages, with the female possibly being the "best preserved" animal discovered from the Ice age.

Paleobiology

P. spelaea inhabited open environment such as mammoth steppe and boreal forest. It was one of the keystone species of the mammoth steppe, being one of the main apex predators alongside gray wolf, cave hyena and brown bear. Large amounts of bones belonging to P. spelaea were excavated in caves, where bones of cave hyena, cave bear and Paleolithic artefacts were also found.
It is unclear whether P. spelaea was social like the modern lion; some evidence indicates that it may have been solitary.

Isotopic analyses of bone collagen samples extracted from fossils indicate that cave bear cubs, reindeer and other cervids were prominent in the diet of cave lions. Later cave lions seem to have preyed foremost on reindeer, up to the brink of local extinction or extirpation of both species. Other possible prey species were giant deer, red deer, wild horse, muskox, aurochs, wisent, steppe bison, young woolly rhino and young woolly mammoth. It likely competed for prey with the European Ice Age leopard (P. pardus spelaea) as well as cave hyenas, cave bears, gray wolves and in North America, short-faced bears and dire wolves. An Isotope analysis study suggested most sampled P. spelea specimens were primarily consuming reindeer.

See also

History of lions in Europe
Panthera atrox
Panthera blytheae
Panthera gombaszoegensis
Panthera palaeosinensis
Panthera shawi
Panthera youngi
Panthera zdanskyi
Panthera leo sinhaleyus
Panthera leo fossilis

References

External links

 Prehistoric cats and prehistoric cat-like creatures, from the Messybeast Cat Resource Archive
 The mammoth and the flood, volume 5, chapter 1, by Hans Krause.
 Hoyle and cavetigers, from the Dinosaur Mailing List. (Groiss)
 Photo-reconstruction of Panthera spelaea, by paleoartist Roman Uchytel

spelaea
spelaea
Pleistocene carnivorans
Pleistocene extinctions
Pleistocene mammals of Asia
Pleistocene mammals of Europe
Pleistocene mammals of North America
Fossil taxa described in 1810
Taxa named by Georg August Goldfuss
Apex predators